Sarp Akkaya (born 13 May 1980) is a Turkish actor. He began acting at the age of twelve along with his twin brother Kaya Akkaya. Their older sister Esra Akkaya is also an actress. Sarp Akkaya and Kaya Akkaya played in TV series Bizim Aile and Muhteşem Yüzyıl together.

He is best known for his role as Sarı Bilal in Suskunlar, as Tefo in Ezel, and as Atmaca in Muhteşem Yüzyıl. He graduated in Theatre from Mimar Sinan Fine Arts University.

Theatre
Markalı Hava
Albay Kuş
Devenin Hörgücü Yamuk Olur

Film
Sen Ben Lenin - 2021 (Police)
Beni Çok Sev - 2021 (Musa)
7. Koğuştaki Mucize - 2019 (Müdür Nail)
Kaybedenler Kulübü Yolda - 2018 (Alper)
Kötü Çocuk - 2017 (Vural Askaya)
Eksik - 2015
El Yazısı - 2012
Kötü Çocuk
Labirent - 2011
Firar - 2011
Kurtlar Vadisi Irak - 2006

Television 

Sıfırıncı Gün - 2022–2023 (Fatih)
Evlilik Hakkında Her Şey - 2021–2022 (Sergen Günay)
Saygı - 2021 (Selim Hacioğlu)
Çukur - 2021 (Şahram)
Ayak İşleri 2021 (Burhan)
Ferhat ile Şirin - 2019 (Kemal)
Kurşun - 2019 (Aydın Kara)
Söz - 2018–2019 (Dragan Ratkoviç)
Paramparça - 2016–2017 (Damir)
Evli ve Öfkeli 2015–2016 (Murat)
Racon 2015 (Recep Güldağ)
Muhteşem Yüzyıl - 2013–2014 (Atmaca)
Şubat 2013 (Lodos)
Suskunlar - 2012–2013 (Bilar/Sari)
Mavi Kelebekler 2011 (Halil Latiç)
Ezel - 2009–2011 (Tefo/Tevfık Bostanci)
Gece Gündüz - 2009
Sürgün Hayatlar - 2008
Beni Unutma - 2008
Şöhret Okulu - 2007
Ertelenmiş Hayatlar - 2007
Kurtlar Vadisi Pusu - 2007 (Servet)
Nefes Nefese - 2005
Ah Be İstanbul - 2004
Bizim Aile - 1996

Voice acting
Dante (Kurtlar Vadisi Irak) 2006
Oktay (Arka Sıradakiler) 2007–2010/ 1–121

References

1980 births
Living people
Turkish twins
Turkish male film actors
Turkish male television actors
Turkish male stage actors
Turkish male child actors
Turkish male voice actors
20th-century Turkish male actors
21st-century Turkish male actors
Male actors from Istanbul